Struttin' is the third studio album by the funk group The Meters. It is the band's first album featuring vocal performances.

Background
The album was recorded in Cosimo Matassa's studio and released in 1970 by Josie Records. It is the band's first album featuring full vocal performances by Art Neville on three tracks, "Wichita Lineman", "Darling, Darling, Darling" and "Ride Your Pony".

Reception
Stephen Erlewine noted a continuation of the band's sound in comparison to previous albums and called it "organic, earthy funk". He noted a stylistic divergence in tracks "Joog", "Hand Clapping Song" and the vocal tracks. He called the music enjoyable but noted a lack of coherence in the song collection. Robert Christgau had a favorable view and wrote of the band's style: "The New Orleans M.G.'s swing, but not smoothly, the way a big band does--their Caribbean lilt is pure second-line, as elliptical as a saint's march."

The first single was the song "Chicken Strut". It reached #11 on the U.S. R&B Singles chart and the album reached #32 on the U.S. R&B Albums chart.

Track listing

Personnel
Credits adapted from AllMusic and Discogs.
The Meters
Art Neville – organ, keyboards, vocals
Leo Nocentelli – guitar
George Porter Jr. – bass guitar
Ziggy Modeliste – drums, percussion
Production
Allen Toussaint – producer
Marshall Sehorn – producer
Tim Livingston – project manager
David Smith –  recording and mixing engineer
Bob Irwin – mastering
Rich Russell – package design

References

External links
Struttin' at discogs

1970 albums
The Meters albums
Albums produced by Allen Toussaint
Josie Records albums